Kandiah Sivanesan is a Sri Lankan Tamil politician and provincial minister.

Career
Sivanesan, also known by the Bavan , is a member of the People's Liberation Organisation of Tamil Eelam and has been linked to the murder of journalist Taraki Sivaram, a charge he has denied.

Sivanesan was one of the Democratic People's Liberation Front's (DPLF) (the political wing of PLOTE) candidates in Vanni District at the 2004 parliamentary election but the DPLF failed to win any seats in Parliament. He contested the 2010 parliamentary election as one of the DPLF's candidates in Vanni but again the DPLF failed to win any seats in Parliament. He was one of the Tamil National Alliance's (TNA) candidates in Vanni District at the 2015 parliamentary election but failed to get elected after coming seventh amongst the TNA candidates.

Sivanesan contested the 2013 provincial council election as one of the TNA's candidates in Mullaitivu District but failed to get elected. However, following the death of K. Swami Veerabahu in February 2015 he was appointed to the Northern Provincial Council in April 2015.

Sivanesan was sworn in as Minister of Agriculture and Agrarian Services, Animal Husbandry, Irrigation, Fisheries, Water Supply and Environment in front of Governor Reginald Cooray on 23 August 2017.

Electoral history

References

Agriculture ministers of Sri Lankan provinces
Democratic People's Liberation Front politicians
Fisheries ministers of Sri Lankan provinces
Living people
Members of the Northern Province Board of Ministers
People from Northern Province, Sri Lanka
Sri Lankan Tamil politicians
Tamil National Alliance politicians
Year of birth missing (living people)